Hear Ye! is an album by the Red Mitchell-Harold Land Quintet recorded in 1961 and released on the Atlantic label.

Reception
The Allmusic review by Scott Yanow states "This is a fine effort from a group that deserved greater recognition at the time".

Track listing
 "Triplin' Awhile" (Harold Land) - 7:46
 "Rosie's Spirit" (Red Mitchell) - 5:26
 "Hear Ye!" (Mitchell) - 6:54
 "Somara" (Carmell Jones) - 6:42
 "Catacomb" (Land) - 8:21
 "Pari Passu" (Frank Strazzeri) - 4:55 	  
Recorded in San Francisco, CA on October 14 (tracks 1, 3 & 4) and December 13 (tracks 2, 5 & 6), 1961

Personnel
Red Mitchell - bass
Harold Land - tenor saxophone
Carmell Jones - trumpet
Frank Strazzeri - piano
Leon Petties - drums

References

 

Atlantic Records albums
Red Mitchell albums
Harold Land albums
1962 albums
Albums produced by Nesuhi Ertegun